Patharpratima Assembly constituency is a Legislative Assembly constituency of South 24 Parganas district in the Indian State of West Bengal.

Overview
As per order of the Delimitation Commission in respect of the Delimitation of constituencies in the West Bengal, Patharpratima Assembly constituency is composed of the following:
 Patharpratimua community development block

Patharpratima Assembly constituency is a part of No. 20 Mathurapur (Lok Sabha constituency).

Members of Legislative Assembly

Election Results

Legislative Assembly Election 2021

Legislative Assembly Election 2016

Legislative Assembly Election 2011

Legislative Assembly Elections 1977-2006
In 2006 and 2001, Jajneswar Das of CPI(M) won the Patharpratima Assembly constituency defeating his nearest rival Samir Kumar Jana of AITC. Gopal Krishna Dey of INC won in 1996 defeating Janmenjay Manna of CPI(M). In 1991, Janmenjay Manna of CPI(M) defeated Banabehari Patra of INC. Gunadhar Maity of CPI(M) won in 1987, 1982 and 1977 defeating Ananta Kumar Bera of INC.

Legislative Assembly Elections 1967-1972
Satya Ranjan Bapuli of INC won in 1972. Rabin Mondal of SUCI(C) won in 1971, 1969 and 1967. The seat did not exist prior to that.

References

Notes

Citations

 

Assembly constituencies of West Bengal
Politics of South 24 Parganas district